Larionovskaya is a rural locality (a village) in Verkhnetoyemsky District, Arkhangelsk Oblast, Russia. The population was 3 as of 2010.

Geography 
Larionovskaya is located on the Severnaya Dvina River, 29 km northwest of Verkhnyaya Toyma (the district's administrative centre) by road. Zelennik is the nearest rural locality.

References 

Rural localities in Verkhnetoyemsky District